Domenico Giacinto Fontana (1692–1739), also known as "Farfallino", was an Italian castrato singer active primarily in Rome from 1712 to 1736. He specialised in singing soprano female roles and earned the name "Farfallino" ("Little Butterfly") for his graceful stage appearance. He was born in Perugia and died there at the age of 47. At times he feared ridicule by performing certain roles, such as a pregnant primadonna.

Roles created
Fontana is known to have created the following roles:
Olimpia in Giovanni Bononcini's Crispo (1721)
Griselda in Alessandro Scarlatti's Griselda (1721)
Hippolyte in Vivaldi's Ercole su'l Termodonte (1723)
Marzia in Leonardo Vinci's Catone in Utica (1728)
Semiramide in Leonardo Vinci's La Semiramide riconosciuta (1729)
Mandane in Leonardo Vinci's Artaserse (1730)
Cleofide in Leonardo Vinci's Alessandro nell'Indie (1730)

References

18th-century Italian male opera singers
Castrati
People from Perugia
1692 births
1739 deaths